Chad Gough (born 17 October 1991) is a United States rugby union player, currently playing for the Utah Warriors of Major League Rugby (MLR) and the United States national team. His preferred position is hooker.

Professional career
Gough signed for Major League Rugby side Utah Warriors for the 2021 Major League Rugby season, having represented the now defunct Colorado Raptors during the 2019 and 2020 season. 

Gough debuted for United States against New Zealand during the 2021 end-of-year rugby union internationals.

References

External links
itsrugby.co.uk Profile

1991 births
Living people
United States international rugby union players
American Raptors players
Utah Warriors players
Rugby union hookers
American rugby union players